George King may refer to:

Politics
 George King (Australian politician) (1814–1894), New South Wales and Queensland politician
 George King, 3rd Earl of Kingston (1771–1839), Irish nobleman and MP for County Roscommon
 George Clift King (1848–1934), English-born mayor of Calgary Alberta
 George Edwin King (1839–1901), Canadian politician; Premier of New Brunswick
 George G. King, Wisconsin farmer and legislator
 George Gerald King (1836–1928), Canadian politician from New Brunswick
 George Gordon King (1807–1870), U.S. Representative from Rhode Island

Sports
 George King (Scottish footballer) (1870–1916), Scottish footballer
 George King (footballer, born 1923) (1923–2009), English footballer
 George King (basketball, born 1928) (1928–2006), American basketball player and head coach
 George King (basketball, born 1994), American basketball player
 George King (cricketer, born 1857) (1857–1944), English cricketer
 George King (cricketer, born 1822) (1822–1881), English cricketer
 George King (New Zealand cricketer) (1845–1894), New Zealand cricketer
 George King (rugby league) (born 1995), Warrington Wolves rugby league player
 George King (Australian footballer) (1892–1976), Australian rules footballer
 George M. King (1896–1963), college football player

Military
 George King (Royal Navy officer) (1809–1891), Commander-in-Chief, China Station
 George Augustus King (1885–1917), officer in the New Zealand Military Forces

Other
 George King (botanist) (1840–1909), British botanist working in India
 George Edward King (1851–1934), Atlanta hardware mogul
 George Lanchester King (1860–1941), bishop of Madagascar, 1899–1919
 George King (film director) (1899–1966), British film director
 George H. King (born 1951), U.S. federal judge
 George Gelaga King (fl. 1974–), Sierra Leone judge
 George Rogers King (1807–1871), Justice of the Louisiana Supreme Court
 George King, actor who played Mr. Flak in Hairspray (2007 film)
 George King (1919–1997), founder of the Aetherius Society

See also
 George King-Hall (1850–1939), Royal Navy admiral and last commander of the Australia Squadron
 George E. King (disambiguation)